Elisha Alexander "Zan" Anderson (October 14, 1866 - July 31, 1941) was an American lawyer and Democratic politician. He was a member of the Mississippi House of Representatives from 1912 to 1920.

Biography 
Elisha Alexander Anderson was born on October 14, 1866, in Perry, now Forrest, County, Mississippi. He was the son of Daniel Austin Anderson, a Confederate Civil War veteran, and Henrietta Rebecca (Stanford) Anderson. Anderson was born and grew up on a farm. In his youth Anderson attended the public schools of Perry County. He decided to be a lawyer and became a law clerk in Hattiesburg, Mississippi. He took a course from the Law Department of Millsaps College and received a L. L. B. when he completed it in 1892. After completing the course, he began practicing law in Hattiesburg. He enlisted in the National Guard during the Spanish-American War. In 1912, he was elected as a Democrat to the Mississippi House of Representatives. He was re-elected to represent Forrest County in the House 1915 for the 1916-1920 term. Anderson died on July 31, 1941.

Personal life 
Anderson married Julia Smith in 1890. They had four children.

References 

1866 births
1941 deaths
People from Forrest County, Mississippi
Democratic Party members of the Mississippi House of Representatives
Mississippi lawyers
People from Hattiesburg, Mississippi